Shark Creek is a small  suburb/village on the north coast of New South Wales, on the Clarence river near Woodford Island, Located southeast of Lawrence, and south of Maclean, New South Wales.

References

Towns in New South Wales
Clarence Valley Council